Jim Geoghan is an American television producer. He is the executive producer of The Disney Channel's The Suite Life on Deck and the original The Suite Life of Zack & Cody. He is a 1969 graduate of New York Institute of Technology.

References

External links

Year of birth missing (living people)
Living people
New York Institute of Technology alumni
American film producers
Place of birth missing (living people)